Austrothemis is a genus of dragonflies in the family Libellulidae, 
endemic to southern Australia.
The single known species, Austrothemis nigrescens, is small and inhabits lakes and swamps.

Species
The genus Austrothemis includes only one species:

Austrothemis nigrescens  - Swamp flat-tail

See also
 List of Odonata species of Australia

References

Libellulidae
Anisoptera genera
Monotypic Odonata genera
Odonata of Australia
Endemic fauna of Australia
Taxa named by Friedrich Ris
Insects described in 1912